Owczarki may refer to the following places:
Owczarki, Lubusz Voivodeship (west Poland)
Owczarki, Pomeranian Voivodeship (north Poland)
Owczarki, Warmian-Masurian Voivodeship (north Poland)